Lepidochrysops intermedia is a butterfly in the family Lycaenidae. It is found in Tanzania, Zambia, Malawi and Mozambique. The habitat consists of Brachystegia woodland.

Adults have been recorded in November and December.

Subspecies
 Lepidochrysops intermedia intermedia (Malawi, Mozambique)
 Lepidochrysops intermedia cottrelli Stempffer, 1954 (the border between Zambia and Malawi on the Nyika Plateau, Tanzania)

References

Butterflies described in 1923
Lepidochrysops